Dino Gonçalo Castro Jorge (born 7 February 1978), shortened to Dino is a retired Portuguese football defender.

References

1978 births
Living people
Portuguese footballers
Atlético Clube de Portugal players
Zamora CF footballers
UD Salamanca players
S.C. Farense players
F.C. Maia players
Associação Académica de Coimbra – O.A.F. players
C.F. União de Lamas players
S.C. Pombal players
Amora F.C. players
C.D. Olivais e Moscavide players
Association football defenders
Primeira Liga players
Segunda Divisão players
La Liga players
Segunda División B players
Portuguese expatriate footballers
Expatriate footballers in Spain
Portuguese expatriate sportspeople in Spain
Footballers from Lisbon